Amazing Grace is a novel by Danielle Steel, published by Delacorte Press in October 2007. The book is Steel's seventy-third novel.

Synopsis
At a charity dinner in San Francisco, the Ritz-Carlton ballroom is ravaged by an earthquake. In the aftermath, four stranger's lives are entwined forever.

Sarah Sloane's perfect life falls apart when her husband is exposed as a fraudster. Grammy winner Melanie Free realises what is important in life. Photographer Everett Carson finds a new purpose to live and nun Sister Maggie Kent, frantically works to rebuild the city and try to hide her feelings of love from her new friend.

At a refugee camp, all four come together and become a support system for the others as life starts to resemble normality and the world blesses them with amazing grace.

Footnotes
 Library « Danielle Steel

2008 American novels
American romance novels
Novels by Danielle Steel

Novels set in San Francisco
Delacorte Press books